Ananta Manikya (d. 1567) was the Maharaja of Tripura from 1563 to 1567. A weak monarch in comparison to his predecessor, he spent his reign under the control of his influential father-in-law. He died after only a few short years of rule, potentially at the latter's hands.

Life
Despite being born the second son of Maharaja Vijaya Manikya II, Ananta was named heir apparent by his father, his elder brother Dangar Fa having been sent to live at the court of Mukunda Deva of Odisha. The reason for this unusual succession is disputed, with the former either having been viewed as possessing the greater physical strength to rule or being born with a more auspicious horoscope.

Following Vijaya's death in 1563, Ananta inherited an extensive and well-consolidated kingdom. Described by historian Dambarudhar Nath as having been "an unworthy son of a worthy father", he proved himself to be a poor monarch, being entirely under the power of his father-in-law, the Commander-in-Chief Gopi Prasad. 

According to the Darrang Raj Vamsavali, a Koch royal chronicle, the Koch king Nara Narayan and his brother Chilarai invaded Tripura around this period. The ruler of Tripura at this point, tentatively identified as Ananta, is stated to have suffered a devastating defeat at their hands, losing up to 18,000 soldiers. However, the authenticity of this text is controversial, leading to the events narrated being viewed with some scepticism.

Ananta reigned only briefly, dying in 1567. The manner of his death is uncertain, with different versions of the Rajmala either stating that it was the result of fever or that he was strangled on the orders of Gopi Prasad. Regardless, the latter afterwards claimed the throne, adopting the name Udai Manikya. Ananta's wife Ratnavati, the new king's daughter, attempted to perform Sati on his funeral pyre, though was prevented from doing so by her father. She was later appeased by being named queen of Chandipur.

References

Kings of Tripura
History of Tripura
Dethroned monarchs
1567 deaths
Murdered Indian monarchs
16th-century murdered monarchs
Deaths by strangulation
Murder in 1567